Buffalo Bill's Brewery is the first brewpub in America. Buffalo Bill's opened their doors on September 9, 1983, and brewed their first batch of beer on August 2, 1983. In 2018, Buffalo Bill's was inducted into the Smithsonian American History Museum as one of the most historic brewpubs in America. Buffalo Bill's closed on June 2, 2022 due to rising business costs and the pandemic.

History and influence 
Before 1983, it was illegal for a brewer to sell directly to the consumer, but that changed in 1982 when Assemblyman, Tom Bates, wrote California Assembly Bill 3610. This bill allowed brewers to sell directly to consumers provided food was served. On January 1, 1983 it became law and the term "brewpub" was officially coined.

Buffalo Bill's was founded in 1983 by Bill Owens, a Guggenheim Fellowship photographer and in 1994 the brewery was purchased by then brewer, Geoff Harries.

Buffalo Bill's is credited with creating the beer styles: Amber Ale (Buffalo Amber, 1983), Pumpkin Ale (America's Original Pumpkin Ale, 1986), and Double IPA (Hearty Ale, 1987). Owens is also credited with creating one of the first craft IPAs in 1987, Alimony Ale. Slogans included "The Bitterest Beer in America", and "It's Irreconcilably Different". Buffalo Bill's impact on the burgeoning craft beer movement was noted in nationwide press with Playboy "[Owens has] taken a very ordinary beverage, brewed it in an offbeat manner, and come up with some highly select idiosyncratic beer. How about Pumpkin Ale made with mashed pumpkins? Or a beer he calls Tasmanian Devil because it's made with Tasmanian hops." and Newsweek recognizing Owen's efforts towards "legislation that could open the spigots for a nationwide surge of brewpubs and microbreweries."

Publications 
Prior to opening Buffalo Bill's, Owens authored the book "How to Build A Small Brewery" in 1981. It was revised and expanded in 1989, and again in 1992 in collaboration with Harries. By this time it had sold over 30,000 copies. With the introduction of "How to Build a Small Brewery", many home brewers switched from extract brewing to grain brewing—a significant advancement in homebrewing for its time. Owens published "How to Build a Small Brewery", "American Brewer Magazine", "Beer the Magazine", "The Brewpub Manual", and a series of maps which chronicled the early craft beer movement in Northern California, from within Buffalo Bill's.

See also 

 List of California breweries
 Beer in the United States
 List of microbreweries
 Brewers Association

References

External links
 

Beer brewing companies based in the San Francisco Bay Area
Companies based in Hayward, California
1983 establishments in California
Restaurants in the San Francisco Bay Area
Culture of Hayward, California
American beer brands
Privately held companies of the United States